Tearju Lunatique may refer to:

Tearju Lunatique, a character from the manga/anime Black Cat
Tearju Lunatique, a character from the manga/anime To Love-Ru